The 2022–2023 mpox outbreak in New York is part of the larger outbreak of human mpox caused by the West African clade of the monkeypox virus in the U.S. state of New York, with no deaths. The state has the highest number of recorded cases in the country.

Background 

An ongoing outbreak of mpox was confirmed on May 6, 2022, beginning with a British resident who, after travelling to Nigeria (where the disease is endemic), presented symptoms consistent with mpox on April 29, 2022. The resident returned to the United Kingdom on May 4, creating the country's index case of the outbreak. The origin of several of the cases of mpox in the United Kingdom is unknown. Some monitors saw community transmission taking place in the London area as of mid-May, but it has been suggested that cases were already spreading in Europe in the previous months.

Transmission 

A large portion of those infected were believed to have not recently traveled to areas of Africa where mpox is normally found, such as Nigeria, the Democratic Republic of the Congo as well as central and western Africa. It is believed to be transmitted by close contact with sick people, with extra caution for those individuals with lesions on their skin or genitals, along with their bedding and clothing. The CDC has also stated that individuals should avoid contact and consumption of dead animals such as rats, squirrels, monkeys and apes along with wild game or lotions derived from animals in Africa.

In addition to more common symptoms, such as fever, headache, swollen lymph nodes, and rashes or lesions, some patients have also experienced proctitis, an inflammation of the rectum lining. CDC has also warned clinicians to not rule out mpox in patients with sexually transmitted infections since there have been reports of co-infections with syphilis, gonorrhea, chlamydia, and herpes.

Timeline
In New York the outbreak began on June 10, 2022, with the first mpox case recorded in Ithaca. On July 29, Governor Kathy Hochul declared a public state disaster emergency in New York State. New York is currently the state with the highest recorded number of cases in the US.

The World Health Organization in New York reports its first mpox case outside New York City on June 7.

On July 13, New York becomes the epicenter of the outbreak. With 489 cases only behind California with 266 cases.

On July 27, New York reaches 1,228 cases, with an increase of 739 cases in only 14 days.

On August 1, Mayor Eric Adams declares a state of emergency over the mpox outbreak.

Cases by county
Based from the NYSDOH.

Notes

References 

New York
2022 in New York (state)
Disease outbreaks in the United States